Lalinrat Chaiwan (born Pattarasuda Chaiwan, 21 February 2001) is a Thai badminton player. She has shown her talent as a badminton player in the junior event tournament. She changed her first name to Phittayaporn after visiting a temple for prayers for a brighter career in badminton. She was crowned champion at the Grand Prix junior tournament in 2017 India and 2018 German, also occupied the girls' singles number 1 in the BWF World Junior Ranking.

Born in Lampang Province, Chaiwan was the silver medalist at the 2017 Asian Junior Championships, where she was before won the Junior U–15 Championships in 2015, and U–17 in 2016. She was part of the national team that won the gold medal at the 2017 Southeast Asian Games in the women's team event. She represented her country at the 2018 Summer Youth Olympics in Buenos Aires, Argentina, won a bronze medal in the girls' singles event.

Achievements

Southeast Asian Games 
Women's singles

Youth Olympic Games 
Girls' singles

World Junior Championships 
Girls' singles

Asian Junior Championships 
Girls' singles

BWF World Tour (1 runner-up) 
The BWF World Tour, which was announced on 19 March 2017 and implemented in 2018, is a series of elite badminton tournaments sanctioned by the Badminton World Federation (BWF). The BWF World Tours are divided into levels of World Tour Finals, Super 1000, Super 750, Super 500, Super 300 (part of the HSBC World Tour), and the BWF Tour Super 100.

Women's singles

BWF International Challenge/Series (2 titles, 2 runners-up) 
Women singles

  BWF International Challenge tournament
  BWF International Series tournament

BWF Junior International (8 titles, 4 runners-up) 
Girls' singles

Girls' doubles

Mixed doubles

  BWF Junior International Grand Prix tournament
  BWF Junior International Challenge tournament
  BWF Junior International Series tournament
  BWF Junior Future Series tournament

Record against selected opponents 
Record against Year-end Finals finalists, World Championships semifinalists, and Olympic quarterfinalists. Accurate as of 28 November 2022.

References

External links 

 

Living people
2001 births
Lalinrat Chaiwan
Lalinrat Chaiwan
Badminton players at the 2018 Summer Youth Olympics
Competitors at the 2017 Southeast Asian Games
Competitors at the 2021 Southeast Asian Games
Lalinrat Chaiwan
Southeast Asian Games medalists in badminton
Lalinrat Chaiwan